Richard S. Gebelein (June 8, 1946 – December 22, 2021) was an American politician and judge who served as the Attorney General of Delaware from 1979 through 1983, as a judge on the Delaware Superior Court from 1984 through 2005, and as an international judge in the Court of Bosnia and Herzegovina.

Career

Early career
Gebelein received his Bachelors degree from the University of Pittsburgh in 1967 and his J.D. degree from Villanova University School of Law in 1970. Gebelein served as Delaware's state solicitor, chief deputy public defender, as well as disciplinary counsel to the Board of Professional Responsibility of the Supreme Court.

Attorney General of Delaware
From 1979 through 1983, Gelebein served as the attorney general of Delaware.

Superior Court of Delaware
Gebelein was appointed by Governor of Delaware Pete du Pont to the Delaware Superior Court, and took office on October 5, 1984.

On August 31, 2005, he retired from the Delaware Superior Court in order to become an international judge on the Court of Bosnia and Herzegovina. He also retired from the Delaware Army National Guard in order to assume this position.

Court of Bosnia and Herzegovina
On August 1, 2005, Paddy Ashdown, High Representative for Bosnia and Herzegovina, appointed Gebelein to  Section I for War Crimes of the Criminal and Appellate Divisions and to Section II for Organised Crime, Economic Crime and Corruption of the Criminal and Appellate Divisions of the Court of Bosnia and Herzegovina. He was appointed for a two-year term.

Return to Delaware
Gebelein retired from the Court of Bosnia and Herzegovnia after being appointed by Delaware Attorney General Beau Biden to serve as his second-in-command as the state's chief deputy attorney general. Biden, a Democrat, received some praise for reaching across party lines in appointing Gebelein, a Republican.

Death 
Gebelein died on December 22, 2021 after a long bout with cancer.

References

1946 births
2021 deaths
Delaware Attorneys General
Delaware Republicans
Delaware Superior Court judges
Deaths from cancer in Delaware